Owen Miller  (born 1 November 1991) is a British Paralympic athlete. He won gold in the Men's 1500 metres T20 at the 2020 Summer Paralympics in Tokyo.

Miller was appointed Member of the Order of the British Empire (MBE) in the 2022 New Year Honours for services to athletics.

References

Living people
1991 births
Sportspeople from Dunfermline
Paralympic athletes of Great Britain
Scottish male middle-distance runners
Athletes (track and field) at the 2020 Summer Paralympics
Medalists at the 2020 Summer Paralympics
Paralympic gold medalists for Great Britain
Members of the Order of the British Empire